Henry John Southern (born 1806) was an English cricketer who was associated with Sheffield Cricket Club and made his first-class debut in 1828.

References

1806 births
Year of death unknown
English cricketers
English cricketers of 1826 to 1863
Sheffield Cricket Club cricketers